A clonk is a fishing tool which has been used in Europe to fish for Wels catfish. It consists of a stick with three parts: handle, fork and heel. Originally it was made of wood but nowadays there are clonks made of plastic or metal too because they are easier to produce than wood.

The process of clonking may look an easy job at first, but it requires some practice. The air bubble produced when the clonk strikes the water is cut by the fork and this produces a unique sound similar to opening a wine bottle. This sound stimulates the defensive instinct in nearby catfish and they attack the "intruder", which in this case is the bait.

Fishing equipment